A tarantula hawk is a spider wasp (Pompilidae) that preys on tarantulas. Tarantula hawks belong to any of the many species in the genera Pepsis and Hemipepsis. They are one of the largest parasitoid wasps, using their sting to paralyze their prey before dragging it to a brood nest as living food; a single egg is laid on the prey, hatching to a larva which eats the still-living host. They are found on all continents other than Antarctica.

Description
The vivid coloration found on their bodies, and especially wings, is an aposematism, advertising to potential predators the wasps' ability to deliver a powerful sting. Their long legs have hooked claws for grappling with their victims.

Behavior
The female tarantula hawk wasp stings a tarantula between the legs, paralyzes it, then drags the prey to a specially prepared burrow, where a single egg is laid on the spider's abdomen, and the burrow entrance is covered. Sex of the larvae is determined by fertilization; fertilized eggs produce females, while unfertilized eggs produce males. When the wasp larva hatches, it creates a small hole in the spider's abdomen, then enters and feeds voraciously, avoiding vital organs for as long as possible to keep the spider alive. After several weeks, the larva pupates. Finally, the wasp becomes an adult and emerges from the spider's abdomen to continue the life cycle.

Adult tarantula hawks are nectarivorous. The consumption of fermented fruit sometimes intoxicates them to the point that flight becomes difficult. While the wasps tend to be most active in the daytime in summer, they tend to avoid high temperatures. The male tarantula hawk does not hunt. Both males and females feed on the flowers of milkweeds, western soapberry trees, or mesquite trees. Male tarantula hawks have been observed practicing a behavior called hill-topping, in which they sit atop tall plants and watch for passing females ready to reproduce. The males can become resident defenders of the favorable reproduction spots for hours into the afternoon. Females are not very aggressive, in that they are hesitant to sting, but the sting is extraordinarily painful.

Distribution
Worldwide distribution of tarantula hawks includes areas from India to Southeast Asia, Africa, Europe, Australia, and the Americas, with the genus Pepsis entirely restricted to the New World. In the latter, Pepsis species have been observed from as far north as Logan, Utah and south as far as Argentina, with at least 250 species living in South America. Eighteen species of Pepsis and three species of Hemipepsis are found in the United States, primarily in the deserts of the southwestern United States, with Pepsis grossa (formerly Pepsis formosa) and Pepsis thisbe being common. The two species are difficult to distinguish, but the majority of P. grossa have metallic blue bodies and reddish antennae, which separates them from P. thisbe. Both species have bright orange wings that become transparent near the tip.

Sting
Tarantula hawk wasps are relatively docile and rarely sting without provocation. However, the sting—particularly that of P. grossa—is among the most painful of all insects, though the intense pain only lasts about five minutes. One researcher described the pain as "...immediate, excruciating, unrelenting pain that simply shuts down one's ability to do anything, except scream. Mental discipline simply does not work in these situations." In terms of scale, the wasp's sting is rated near the top of the Schmidt sting pain index, second only to that of the bullet ant, and is described by Schmidt as "blinding, fierce[, and] shockingly electric". Because of their extremely large stingers, very few animals are able to eat them; one of the few that can is the roadrunner. Many predatory animals avoid these wasps, and many different insects mimic them, including various other wasps and bees (Müllerian mimics), as well as moths, flies (e.g., mydas flies), and beetles (e.g., Tragidion) (Batesian mimics).

Aside from the possibility of triggering an allergic reaction, the sting is not dangerous and does not require medical attention. Local redness appears in most cases after the pain, and lasts for up to a week.

State insect of New Mexico
The U.S. state of New Mexico chose a species of tarantula hawk (specifically, P. formosa, now known as P. grossa) in 1989 to become its official state insect. Its selection was prompted by a group of elementary school children from Edgewood doing research on states that had adopted state insects. They selected three insects as candidates and mailed ballots to all schools for a statewide election. The winner was the tarantula hawk wasp.

References

External links

'"Instantaneous, Electrifying, Excruciating Pain", book excerpt by entomologist Justin O. Schmidt

Pepsinae
Aposematic species